Hank Osasuna is an actor and performance artist. He grew up in Chadwell Heath in London.  After working in The House of Lords for 14 years, Hank took up acting full-time and has appeared in many prime time advertisements for brands such as Cadburys, Heineken, 118.  Hank is the pioneer of punk rock poetry – a mix of a cappella singing, poetry and comedy.  He has been heavily involved in promoting and performing on both the American and British antifolk circuits. His performance persona is Spinmaster Plantpot. When performing a set in 2008 he was discovered by Leigh Francis – and offered a part in Keith Lemon's Brilliant World Tour as Mad Paul.  After this, Hank subsequently appeared as Mad Paul in Keith Lemon: The Film and ITV2 series Lemon La Vida Loca. He is known for his height – 4 feet eleven inches.
http://www.houseoftracks.tv/interviews/hank-osasuna-aka-spinmaster-plantpot-interview/  In October 2015, he appeared in Keith Lemon's Back T'Future Tribute on ITV2.

He appeared as various characters in Keith Lemon's ITV2 series The Keith Lemon Sketch Show from 2015 until 2016.  He also appeared in The Keith And Paddy Picture Show series 1 and 2 – as well as Keith Lemon; Coming In America

References

1972 births
Living people
English male actors
People from Chadwell Heath